Amalda hilgendorfi is a species of sea snail, a marine gastropod mollusc in the family Ancillariidae, the olives.

Subspecies
 Amalda hilgendorfi herlaari Van Pel, 1989
 Amalda hilgendorfi hilgendorfi (Martens, 1897)
 Amalda hilgendorfi richeri Kilburn & Bouchet, 1988
 Amalda hilgendorfi vezzaroi Cossignani, 2015

Description

Distribution

References

 Tsuchida E. (2017). Family Olivellidae. pp. 995–997, in: T. Okutani (ed.), Marine Mollusks in Japan, ed. 2. 2 vols. Tokai University Press. 1375 pp.

hilgendorfi
Gastropods described in 1897